Tabak is a surname and may refer to:

Benny Tabak (born 1956), former Israeli footballer
David Tabak (1927–2012), Israeli Olympic runner
Jiří Tabák (born 1955), retired Czech gymnast
Lawrence A. Tabak, American dentist and biomedical scientist
Mirjana Tabak (born 1972), Croatian former female professional basketball player
Noortje Tabak (born 1988), former Dutch road cyclist
Romana Tabak (born 1991), Slovak professional tennis player
Ronald Tabak (disambiguation)
Tino Tabak, Dutch-born New Zealand cyclist
Vincent Tabak, Dutch engineer and convicted murderer
Žan Tabak (born 1970), Croatian basketball player

See also
Tabak Division, official name of the 1st Infantry Division, Philippine Army
Tabak-Toyok, a Filipino flail weapon consisting of a pair of sticks connected by a chain
Tobacco, known as tabak in German, Dutch, and other languages